The 2016 Ulster Senior Club Football Championship was the 49th instalment of the annual Ulster Senior Club Football Championship organised by Ulster GAA. It was one of the four provincial competitions of the 2016–17 All-Ireland Senior Club Football Championship. 

Armagh's Crossmaglen Rangers were the 2015 champions, but defeat in the Armagh semi-final meant they couldn't defend their title.

Derry champions Slaughtneil claimed their second Ulster title by beating Down champions Kilcoo in the final.

Teams
The Ulster championship is contested by the winners of the nine county championships in the Irish province of Ulster. Ulster comprises the six counties of Northern Ireland, as well as Cavan, Donegal and Monaghan in the Republic of Ireland.

Bracket

Preliminary round

Quarter-finals

Semi-finals

Final

Championship statistics

Top scorers
Overall

In a single game

References

2U
Ulster Senior Club Football Championship
2016 in Northern Ireland sport